The Book of Noah is thought to be a non-extant Old Testament pseudepigraphal work, attributed to Noah. It is quoted in several places in another pseudepigraphal work, 1 Enoch, and is mentioned in another, the Book of Jubilees. There have also been fragments attributed to a Book of Noah in the Dead Sea Scrolls.

Fragments

Though this book has not come down to us independently, it has in large measure been incorporated in the Ethiopic Book of Enoch, and can in part be reconstructed from it. 

The Book of Noah is mentioned in Jubilees 10:13, 21:10. Chapters 60., 65-69:25 of the Ethiopic Enoch are without question derived from it. Thus 60 runs: 

In the year 500, in the seventh month ... in the life of Enoch.

Here the editor simply changed the name Noah in the context before him into Enoch, for the statement is based on Gen. 5:32, and Enoch lived only 365 years. Chapters 6-11 are clearly from the same source; for they make no reference to Enoch, but bring forward Noah (10:1) and treat of the sin of the angels that led to the flood, and of their temporal and eternal punishment. This section is compounded of the Semjaza and Azazel myths, and in its present composite form is already presupposed by 1 Enoch 88-90. Hence these chapters are earlier than 166 B.C. Chapters 106-107 of the same book are probably from the same source; likewise 54:7-55:2, and Jubilees 7:20-39, 10:1-15.  In the former passage of Jubilees the subject-matter leads to this identification, as well as the fact that Noah is represented as speaking in the first person, although throughout Jubilees it is the angel that speaks. Possibly Eth. En. 41:3-8, 43-49, 59 are from the same work. The book may have opened with Eth. En. 106-107 On these chapters may have followed Eth. En. 6-11., 65-69:25, 60, 41:3-8, 43-44, 54:7-55:2; Jubilees 7:26-39, 10:1-15.

The Hebrew Book of Noah, a later work, is printed in Adolf Jellinek's Bet ha-Midrasch, 3:155-156, and translated into German in Rönsch, Das Buch der Jubiläen, 385-387. It is based on the part of the above Book of Noah which is preserved in the Book of Jubilees. The portion of this Hebrew work which is derived from the older work is reprinted in Charles's Ethiopic Version of the Hebrew Book of Jubilees, p. 179.

James Charlesworth writes (footnotes used for clarity)

During the early parts of the second century B.C. a pseudepigraphon circulated that contained considerable material concerning Noah. The tradition was not merely oral but had been written down, since the author of Jubilees and of an interpolation in the Testament of Levi 18:2 refer to a 'Book of Noah'.

The work is now lost except for excerpts preserved in 1 Enoch and Jubilees, for 21 fragments preserved in Qumran Cave 1, and for two large fragments found in Cave 4 that are not yet published.

Fragment 4Q534 of the Book of Noah in the Dead sea scrolls describes the physical appearance of the royal messiah:

There seems to be some conjecture as to what exactly was contained in the Book of Noah. Cana Werman, who wrote a paper Qumran and The Book of Noah, notes the inconsistency of various sources.

References

Further reading
James Charlesworth, The Pseudepigrapha and Modern Research

External links 
Book of Noah from the Early Jewish Writings Website
Qumran and The Book of Noah by Cana Werman
Material from a Book of Noah in 1 Enoch by Daniel Falk
Noachic Traditions and the Book of Noah by Wayne Baxter
 Michael E. Stone, Noah, Books of, in the Encyclopedia Judaica.

Old Testament pseudepigrapha
Noah
Lost books
Book of Jubilees
Book of Enoch